The American trusteeship proposal for Palestine, formally known as the United States Proposal for Temporary United Nations Trusteeship for Palestine and announced by President Harry S. Truman on 25 March 1948, was a revised plan from the United States government for the future of the British Mandate for Palestine. The proposal came four months after the approval in the General Assembly of the United Nations Partition Plan for Palestine which had been vigorously supported by the United States, and represented a major shift in policy in response to the ongoing 1947–1948 Civil War in Mandatory Palestine.

Background

On March 18, the  United Nations Special Committee on Palestine reported that it had been unable to arrange a truce and recommended a temporary trusteeship for Palestine in order to restore peace.

The following day, United States Ambassador to the United Nations Warren Austin announced that the United States believes that the partition of Palestine was no longer a viable option. On March 20, United States Secretary of State George Marshall confirmed the United States' view that the proposal for a temporary United Nations trusteeship for Palestine is the only idea presently being considered that will allow the United Nations to address the difficult situation in Palestine.

According to the Truman library, Truman wrote a number of personal statements in the following days recording his perspective ahead of the announcement on March 25:
 March 21, 1948: President Truman writes in his diary regarding the confusion caused by the State Department's handling of the trusteeship issue: "I spend the day trying to right what has happened. No luck. Marshall makes a statement. Doesn't help a bit."
 March 21, 1948: President Truman writes to his sister Mary Jane Truman that the "striped pants conspirators" in the State Department had "completely balled up the Palestine situation." But, he writes, "it may work out anyway in spite of them."
 March 22, 1948: President Truman writes to his brother Vivian Truman regarding Palestine: "I think the proper thing to do, and the thing I have been doing, is to do what I think is right and let them all go to hell."

The proposal

The trusteeship proposal was supported by Loy W. Henderson, head of the Near Eastern Affairs Bureau, who opposed US support for partition because he believed it would hurt US interests in Arab countries. The proposal was drafted by Clark Clifford, White House Counsel and Max Lowenstein.

"The United States has proposed to the Security Council a temporary United Nations trusteeship for Palestine to provide a government to keep the peace. Such trusteeship was proposed only after we had exhausted every effort to find a way to carry out partition by peaceful means. Trusteeship is not proposed as a substitute for the partition plan but as an effort to fill the vacuum soon to be created by the termination of the mandate on May 15. The trusteeship does not prejudice the character of the final political settlement. It would establish the conditions of order which are essential to a peaceful solution."

See also
 United Nations Trusteeship Council

References

External links
 Truman, the Jewish vote, and the creation of Israël, By John Snetsinger
 Truman and Israel,  By Michael Joseph Cohen

1948 Arab–Israeli War
Israeli–Palestinian conflict
Palestine and the United Nations
1948 in international relations
Documents of Mandatory Palestine